Presidential Commission may refer to:

Presidential Commission (Ireland)
Presidential commission (United States)
Presidential Commission of Inquiry
Presidential Commission of Uganda
Presidential Commission of Ghana
Presidential Commission on the Status of Women
Presidential Commission for the Study of the Communist Dictatorship in Romania
Presidential Commission of the Russian Federation to Counter Attempts to Falsify History to the Detriment of Russia's Interests

Government commissions